Zik was a 4th-century Iranian officer active during the reign of the Sasanian king (shah) Shapur II. He was a member of the House of Zik, one of the Seven Great Houses of Iran. Not much is known about him; he was in  along with Karen given a large army to rule over Armenia, which had recently been seized by the Iranian army.

References

Sources 
 

4th-century Iranian people
Generals of Shapur II
Year of death unknown
Year of birth unknown
House of Zik